Albert Grant may refer to:

 Albert W. Grant (1856–1930), admiral of the US Navy during World War I
 Albert Grant (company promoter) (1831–1899), Irish born British company promoter
 Albie Grant (1943–2004), American basketball player